The Locke House and Barn is a home and outbuilding in Lockeford, California that is now the Inn at Locke House. The house, built in 1858, the barn, built in 1852, and the water tower, built in 1887, were the first structures to be listed on the National Register of Historic Places in San Joaquin County, California when the property was added to the National Register in 1972.

History 

The two-story brick home was built in 1858 by Dr. Dean Jewett Locke, one of the founders of Lockeford. A brick water tower was added in 1887. The home had twenty-two rooms and housed the Locke family with thirteen children. The last surviving child of Dr. and Mrs. Locke lived in the home until her death in 1969.

The second floor of the barn served as a community meeting place for groups such as the Lockeford Good Templar Society, the Congregational Church, and the Ladies Home Library Association. During the American Civil War, it served as the armory of the Mokelumne Dragoons, the local (union) militia.

References

External links
 The Inn at Locke House, official site

National Register of Historic Places in San Joaquin County, California
Buildings and structures completed in 1858